Deva is a 2017 Indian Marathi-language romantic drama film, directed by Murali Nallappa and produced by Prateek Chakravorty . The film stars Ankush Chaudhari, Tejaswini Pandit, Spruha Joshi in lead roles.
The movie is a remake of 2015 Malayalam blockbuster movie Charlie.

Cast 

Ankush Chaudhari as Deva
Tejaswini Pandit as Maya
Spruha Joshi as Meera
Mohan Agashe as Krishnakant
Vaibhav Mangle as Bhalchandra
Reema Lagoo as Shalini
Pandharinath Kamble as Raghu Barve
Mayur Pawar as Raosaheb / Gotya
Jyoti Chandekar as Maya's Mother
Jaywant Wadkar
Reshma Shinde as Shruti
Soumya Kulkarni as Tanu

Soundtrack

References

External links
 

2010s Marathi-language films
2017 films
2017 romantic drama films
Indian romantic drama films
Marathi remakes of Malayalam films